This list of emperors of Japan presents the traditional order of succession. Records of the reigns are compiled according to the traditional Japanese calendar. In the nengō system which has been in use since the late-seventh century, years are numbered using the Japanese era name and the number of years which have taken place since that nengō era started. The sequence, order and dates of the early emperors are almost entirely based on the 8th-century Nihon Shoki, which tried to retroactively legitimize the Yamato dynasty by dating its foundation further back to the year 660 BC. There are several theories as to who the first Japanese ruler to be backed up by historical evidence; Emperor Yūryaku (r. 456–479), Emperor Kinmei (r. 539–571), etc. The term Tennō ('Emperor'), as well as Nihon ('Japan'), wasn't adopted until the late 7th century.

Emperors of Japan

Individuals posthumously recognized as emperors
This is a list of individuals who did not reign as emperor during their lifetime but were later recognized as Japanese emperors posthumously.

Gallery

See also
 Emperor of Japan
 Empress of Japan
 List of empresses consort of Japan
 Sesshō and Kampaku
 Shogun
 List of shoguns
 Prime Minister of Japan
 List of prime ministers of Japan
 Family tree of Japanese monarchs
 Empress Tsunuzashi

Notes

Citations

References

External links
 The Imperial Household Agency
 Japan opens imperial tombs for research

 
Japan
Japan history-related lists
Lists of Japanese people by occupation